Baranagar (also referred to as Baronagar, Barnagar) is a village in the Murshidabad-Jiaganj CD block in the Lalbag subdivision of Murshidabad district in the state of West Bengal, India.

Geography

Location                           

Area overview
While the Lalbag subdivision is spread across both the natural physiographic regions of the district, Rarh and Bagri, the Domkal subdivision occupies the north-eastern corner of Bagri. In the map alongside, the Ganges/ Padma River flows along the northern portion. The border with Bangladesh can be seen in the north and the east. Murshidabad district shares with Bangladesh a porous international border which is notoriously crime prone (partly shown in this map). The Ganges has a tendency to change course frequently, causing severe erosion, mostly along the southern bank. The historic city of Murshidabad, a centre of major tourist attraction, is located in this area. In 1717, when Murshid Quli Khan became Subahdar, he made Murshidabad the capital of Subah Bangla (then Bengal, Bihar and Odisha). The entire area is overwhelmingly rural with over 90% of the population living in the rural areas.

Note: The map alongside presents some of the notable locations in the subdivisions. All places marked in the map are linked in the larger full screen map.

Demographics
According to the 2011 Census of India, Baranagar had a total population of 1,721, of which 913 (53%) were males and 808 (47%) were females. Population in the age range 0–6 years was 202. The total number of literate persons in Baranagar was 1,212 (79.79% of the population 6 years).

Culture

David J. McCutchion focuses on several temples at Baranagar:
Char Bangla Temples are mentioned as ek-bangla structures with triple entrance, measuring 31’ x 15–16.5’. The northern temple is dated 1760. Two of the temples have rich terracotta façade, one has incised plaster and the fourth one is plain.
 Panchanan Siva temple, is an 18th-century ek-bangla structure with triple entrance, with renovated terracotta designs.
 The Gangesvara temple, is a mid-18th century standard jor bangla, measuring 22’ 6” x 26’ 3” with rich terracotta façade.
 The Ramonathesvara temple, is a large char chala temple on a square base with a single entrance, measuring around 19’ square, built in 1741, having rich terracotta façade.

According to the List of Monuments of National Importance in West Bengal the Bhavaniswar Mandir and the Char Bangla group of four Siva Mandirs are ASI listed monuments.

Rani Bhabani (1716-1795) was wife of Raja Ramakanta, zamindar of Natore, in Rajshahi district, now in Bangladesh. After she became a widow at the age of 32, she ran her zamindari smoothly and earned fame for her philanthropic activities. According to Shyamal Chaterji, researcher on Hindu iconography, “It is said that Rani Bhavani wanted to build 108 temples here at Baronagar on the shore of the Ganges to lift the status of this settlement to that of Varanasi. She stopped at 107; I have not heard any story about the reason.” Only a few of the temples are in good shape.

Baranagar picture gallery

Transport

Poradanga halt railway station, on the Barharwa–Azimganj–Katwa loop, is located nearby.

Country boats are available for travel between Ajimganj and Baranagar.

References

External links

Villages in Murshidabad district